Jovan Vučinić (Serbian Cyrillic: Јован Вучинић, born 20 January 1992) is a Montenegrin footballer who most recently played as forward for Montenegrin First League club FK Petrovac.

Club career
Born in Bar, while still young he moved to Belgrade where he joined the youth teams of FK Partizan. In summer 2010 he moved to Partizan's satellite club FK Teleoptik where he made his senior debut by playing in the Serbian First League.  In June 2011 he signed a 2-year contract with top-flight side FK Smederevo.

Jagodina
On July 31, 2013, it was announced that Vučinić signed a three-year contract with FK Jagodina along with fellow countryman Đorđe Šušnjar.

International career
At national team level, he has been a regular member of the Montenegro national under-19 football team during the years of 2010 and 2011.

In August 2012 he received a call from the Montenegrin U-21 team to participate in the Valeriy Lobanovsky International Tournament.  Montenegro finished second in the tournament and Jovan Vučinić played in both matches involving the Montenegrin team.

References

External links
 

1992 births
Living people
People from Bar, Montenegro
Serbian people of Montenegrin descent
Association football forwards
Serbian footballers
Serbia youth international footballers
Montenegrin footballers
Montenegro youth international footballers
Montenegro under-21 international footballers
FK Teleoptik players
FK Smederevo players
FK Čukarički players
FK Jagodina players
FK Mornar players
FK Radnik Bijeljina players
FK Bokelj players
OFK Petrovac players
Serbian First League players
Serbian SuperLiga players
Montenegrin First League players
Premier League of Bosnia and Herzegovina players
Montenegrin expatriate footballers
Expatriate footballers in Bosnia and Herzegovina
Montenegrin expatriate sportspeople in Bosnia and Herzegovina